Satan's Kingdom State Recreation Area is a public recreation area occupying one-acre (0.40468 ha) of land beside the Farmington River in the town of New Hartford, Connecticut. The site is located on the north side of the Route 44 bridge over the Farmington River. It is used as a put-in for canoeing, kayaking, and tubing excursions on the river.

History 
The gorge through which the Farmington River flows has been known as "Satan’s Kingdom" since the 1870s, when the construction of the New Haven and Northampton Railroad along the river proved particularly difficult.

The recreation area was added to the roll of Connecticut state parks in 2012.

Activities and amenities 

Tube rentals are offered by a concessionaire. A  trip encounters three sets of rapids. Hiking trails in neighboring Nepaug State Forest, including the Tunxis Trail, are accessible from Satan's Kingdom Road on the south side of the bridge.

References

External links
Satan's Kingdom State Recreation Area Connecticut Department of Energy and Environmental Protection

State parks of Connecticut
Parks in Litchfield County, Connecticut
New Hartford, Connecticut
Protected areas established in 2012
2012 establishments in Connecticut